Janet Pierrehumbert  (b. 1954) is Professor of Language Modelling in the Oxford e-Research Centre at the University of Oxford and a senior research fellow of Trinity College, Oxford. She developed an intonational model which includes a grammar of intonation patterns and an explicit algorithm for calculating pitch contours in speech, as well as an account of intonational meaning. It has been widely influential in speech technology, psycholinguistics, and theories of language form and meaning. Pierrehumbert is also affiliated with the New Zealand Institute of Language Brain and Behaviour at the University of Canterbury.

Education
AB Linguistics, Harvard University, 1975

PhD Linguistics, Massachusetts Institute of Technology, 1980.

Career
Pierrehumbert did her postdoctoral work in the Research Laboratory of Electronics at MIT. She joined AT&T Bell Labs as a member of Technical Staff in linguistics and artificial intelligence research in 1982, where her collaborators included Mary Beckman, Julia Hirschberg, and Mark Liberman. She moved to the linguistics department at Northwestern University in 1989. In 2015, she took up her present position in the Oxford e-Research Centre in the Department of Engineering Sciences at Oxford. She has held visiting appointments at Stanford University, Oxford, the Royal Institute of Technology, ENST, École Normale Supérieure, and Stockholm University. She is one of the founders of the Association for Laboratory Phonology, an interdisciplinary initiative to develop advanced scientific methods for studying language sound structure.

Research
Pierrehumbert's research uses experimental and computational methods to study the structure of language systems. Her current research focusses on the dynamics of the lexicon in individuals and populations. It uses large-scale text mining, computational modelling, and experiments paradigms that resemble computer games.

Honours and awards
Pierrehumbert received a Guggenheim Fellowship in 1996, and is also a fellow of the American Academy of Arts and Sciences, the Linguistic Society of America, and the Cognitive Science Society. She held the Edward Sapir Professorship at the 2013 Linguistic Society of America Summer Institute hosted by the University of Michigan. In 2019 she was elected a member of the US National Academy of Sciences. She is the 2020 recipient of the Medal for Scientific Achievement from the International Speech Communication Association.

Personal life

Pierrehumbert is married to Raymond Pierrehumbert, Halley Professor of Physics at the University of Oxford.

References and publications

External links 
 Homepage at Oxford.  
 Web site for the Wordovators project

Living people
Linguists from the United States
Women linguists
Phoneticians
Phonologists
Academics of the University of Oxford
Radcliffe College alumni
Fellows of the American Academy of Arts and Sciences
Fellows of the Cognitive Science Society
Fellows of the Linguistic Society of America
Members of the United States National Academy of Sciences
MIT School of Humanities, Arts, and Social Sciences alumni
Fellows of Trinity College, Oxford
1954 births